Canopus Hill is located on the island of East Falkland near Stanley, the capital city of the Falkland Islands.  It is named after HMS Canopus which fired the first shots in the Battle of the Falkland Islands during World War I.

References 

East Falkland
Stanley, Falkland Islands